The 1969 All-Pacific Coast football team consists of American football players chosen by the Associated Press (AP), the United Press International (UPI), and the Pacific-8 Conference coaches (Coaches) as the best college football players by position in the Pacific Coast region during the 1969 NCAA University Division football season. The AP and UPI selections included players from within and outside the Pacific-8 Conference. The Coaches selections were limited to Pacific-8 players.

The 1969 UCLA Bruins football team led all other programs with nine players selected to one or more of the first teams. UCLA's first-team players were: running backs Greg Jones (AP-1, UPI-1, Coaches-1) and Mickey Cureton (UPI-1); end Gwen Cooper (AP-1, UPI-1, Coaches-1); offensive tackle Gordon Bosserman (UPI-1); offensive guard Dennis Alumbaugh (AP-1, Coaches-1); defensive tackles Floyd Reese (AP-1, Coaches-1) and Wes Grant (Coaches-1); linebacker Mike Ballou (AP-1, UPI-1, Coaches-1); and defensive back Ron Carver (UPI-1).

The undefeated 1969 USC Trojans football team was ranked No. 3 in the final AP Poll and placed seven players on the first team: running back Clarence Davis (AP-1, UPI-1, Coaches-1); offensive tackle Sid Smith (AP-1, UPI-1, Coaches-1); offensive guard Fred Khasigian (AP-1, UPI-1, Coaches-1); defensive end Jimmy Gunn (AP-1, UPI-1); defensive tackle Al Cowlings (AP-1, UPI-1, Coaches-1); and defensive backs Tyrone Hudson (AP-1, Coaches-1) and Sandy Durko (UPI-1).

Offensive selections

Quarterbacks
 Jim Plunkett, Stanford (AP-1; UPI-1; Coaches-1)
 Dennis Shaw, San Diego State (AP-2; UPI-2)

Running backs
 Clarence Davis, USC (AP-1; UPI-1; Coaches-1)
 Greg Jones, UCLA (AP-1; UPI-1; Coaches-1)
 Bobby Moore, Oregon (AP-1; UPI-1 [end]; Coaches-1)  (later Ahmad Rashad)
 Mickey Cureton, UCLA (AP-2; UPI-1)
 Bob Cornell, Washington (AP-2)
 Gary Fowler, California (AP-2)
 Bubba Brown, Stanford (UPI-2)
 George Farmer, UCLA (UPI-2)
 Billy Main, Oregon State (UPI-2)

Ends
 Gwen Cooper, UCLA (AP-1; UPI-1; Coaches-1)
 Bob Moore, Stanford (AP-1; UPI-2; Coaches-1)
 Tom Reynolds, San Diego State (AP-2; UPI-2)
 Sam Dickerson, USC (AP-2)

Tackles
 Sid Smith, USC (AP-1; UPI-1; Coaches-1)
 Bob Richards, California (AP-1; UPI-2; Coaches-1)
 Gordon Bosserman, UCLA (AP-2; UPI-1)
 Ernie Janet, Washington (AP-2)
 Pete Seymour, Stanford (UPI-2)

Guards
 Fred Khasigian, USC (AP-1; UPI-1; Coaches-1)
 Dennis Alumbaugh, UCLA (AP-1; UPI-2; Coaches-1)
 Bob Reinhard, Stanford (AP-2; UPI-1)
 Greg Hendren, California (AP-2)
 Steve Lehmer, USC (UPI-2)

Centers
 John Sande, Stanford (AP-2; UPI-1; Coaches-1)
 Bill Pierson, San Diego State (AP-1)
 Mike White, Oregon State (UPI-2)

Defensive selections

Defensive ends
 Jimmy Gunn, USC (AP-1; UPI-1)
 Irby Augustine, California (AP-1; UPI-1)
 Charlie Weaver, USC (AP-2)
 Wes Grant, UCLA (AP-2; UPI-2)
 Dennis Gasner, Oregon State (UPI-2)

Defensive tackles
 Al Cowlings, USC (AP-1 [defensive tackle]; UPI-1 [defensive tackle]; Coaches-1 [interior line])
 Floyd Reese, UCLA (AP-1 [defensive tackle]; UPI-2 [defensive tackle]; Coaches-1 interior line])
 Wes Grant, UCLA (Coaches-1 [interior line])
 Lee Brock, Washington (AP-2 [defensive tackle]; UPI-1 [defensive tackle])
 Tody Smith, USC (AP-2)
 Bill Nelson, Oregon State (AP-2)

Middle guards
 Jess Lewis, Oregon State (AP-1 [middle guard]; UPI-2 [defensive tackle]; Coaches-1 [interior line])

Linebackers
 Mike Ballou, UCLA (AP-1; UPI-1; Coaches-1)
 Don Parish, Stanford (AP-1; UPI-1; Coaches-1)
 Tom Graham, Oregon (AP-1; UPI-1)
 Phil Croyle, California (AP-2; UPI-2)
 Greg Slough, USC (AP-2)
 Pat Preston, Stanford (AP-2)
 Vic Ornelas, Pacific (UPI-2)
 Paul Martyr, California (UPI-2)

Defensive backs
 Lionel Thomas, Washington State (AP-1; UPI-1; Coaches-1)
 Mel Easley, Oregon State (AP-1; UPI-2; Coaches-1)
 Tyrone Hudson, USC (AP-1; UPI-2; Coaches-1)
 Rich Keller, Stanford (AP-2; Coaches-1)
 Sandy Durko, USC (AP-2; UPI-1)
 Ron Carver, UCLA (AP-2; UPI-1)
 Ken Wiedemann, California (UPI-1)
 Jim Kauffman, Stanford (UPI-2)
 Jack Gleason, Oregon (UPI-2)

Key
AP = Associated Press

UPI = United Press International

Coaches = selected by the Pac-8 head football coaches

See also
1969 College Football All-America Team

References

All-Pacific-8 Conference Football Team
All-Pac-12 Conference football teams